Thornton Gainsborough "Tom" Clarke (27 November 1891 – 19 July 1916) was an Australian rules footballer who played with Fitzroy in the Victorian Football League (VFL), and the Essendon Association Football Club in the Victorian Football Association (VFA).

Family
The son of Arthur Clarke (-1934), and Rebecca Ann Clarke (-1940), née Cooke, Thornton Gainsborough Clarke was born in Essendon, Victoria on 27 November 1891.

He married Annie Muriel Walker (1889–1976) on 16 June 1915.

Their son, Thornton Vernon Clarke – later, Flight Lieutenant Thornton Vernon Clarke, DFC (408954) – was born on 4 March 1916, after Clarke had left Australia with the First AIF.

Football

Fitzroy (VFL)
Granted a permit from Mount Lyell to Fitzroy on 17 May 1911, 19-year-old Clarke played four First XVIII games for Fitzroy in the 1911 VFL season.

Essendon A (VFA)
He played in 88 games and scored 218 goals over six seasons (1910 to 1915) for Essendon Association Football Club in the Victorian Football Association (VFA).

In 1913 and 1914 he was the VFA's leading goalkicker, with 58 and 46 goals respectively.

Military service
Qualified as an electrical engineer, and employed at G. Weymouth Pty. Ltd., Electrical Engineers, in Richmond, he enlisted in the First AIF in July 1915, and served with the 60th Infantry Battalion.

Death

Clarke was killed in action on 19 July 1916, soon after arriving on the Western Front, during the Battle of Fromelles.

Initially listed as "missing", he was officially declared "killed in action", by a Court of Enquiry held in France on 4 August 1917.

Buried in a mass grave at the time of his death, his remains were never recovered, and he is commemorated at the V.C. Corner Australian Cemetery and Memorial in Fromelles, France.

See also
 List of Victorian Football League players who died in active service

Footnotes

References

 
 World War One Embarkation Roll: Private Thornton Gainsborough Clarke (2830), collection of the Australian War Memorial.
 World War One Nominal Roll: Corporal Thornton Gainsborough Clarke (2830), collection of the Australian War Memorial.
 Australian Red Cross Society Wounded and Missing Enquiry Bureau files, 1914-18 War: 1DRL/0428: 2830 Corporal Thornton Gainsborough Clarke: 60 Battalion, Collection of the Australian War Memorial.
 World War One Service Record: Corporal Thornton Gainsborough Clarke (2830), National Archives of Australia.
 Roll of Honour: Corporal Thornton Gainsborough Clarke (2830), Australian War Memorial.
 Roll of Honour Circular: Corporal Thornton Gainsborough Clarke (2830), collection of the Australian War Memorial.
 Australian Roll of Honour: Missing: Victoria, The Age, (Saturday, 16 September 1916), p.11: this is a combined version of 212th and 213th Casualty lists, simultaneously released om 15 September 1916 (Clarke was listed in the 212th list).
 335th Casualty List: Victoria: Previously Missing, now Reported Killed, The Herald, (Monday, 3 September 1917), p.3.
 Football at Lemnos, The Essendon Gazette, (Thursday, 9 March 1916), p.6.

External links
 Corporal Thornton Gainsborough Clarke (2830), Commonwealth War Graves Commission.
 
 Tom Clarke, at AustralianFootball.com
 Thornton "Tom" Clarke, at The VFA Project

1891 births
1916 deaths
Australian rules footballers from Tasmania
Australian Rules footballers: place kick exponents
Fitzroy Football Club players
Essendon Association Football Club players
Australian military personnel killed in World War I
Missing in action of World War I
Australian rules footballers from Melbourne
People from Essendon, Victoria
Military personnel from Melbourne